In mathematical notation for numbers, a signed-digit representation is a positional numeral system with a set of signed digits used to encode the integers.

Signed-digit representation can be used to accomplish fast addition of integers because it can eliminate chains of dependent carries.  In the binary numeral system, a special case signed-digit representation is the non-adjacent form, which can offer speed benefits with minimal space overhead.

History
Challenges in calculation stimulated early authors Colson (1726) and Cauchy (1840) to use signed-digit representation. The further step of replacing negated digits with new ones was suggested by Selling (1887) and Cajori (1928).

In 1928, Florian Cajori noted the recurring theme of signed digits, starting with Colson (1726) and Cauchy (1840). In his book History of Mathematical Notations, Cajori titled the section "Negative numerals". For completeness, Colson uses examples and describes addition (pp. 163–4), multiplication (pp. 165–6) and division (pp. 170–1) using a table of multiples of the divisor. He explains the convenience of approximation by truncation in multiplication. Colson also devised an instrument (Counting Table) that calculated using signed digits.

Eduard Selling advocated inverting the digits 1, 2, 3, 4, and 5 to indicate the negative sign. He also suggested snie, jes, jerd, reff, and niff as names to use vocally. Most of the other early sources used a bar over a digit to indicate a negative sign for it. Another German usage of signed-digits was described in 1902 in Klein's encyclopedia.

Definition and properties

Digit set
This function,  is what rigorously and formally establishes how integer values are assigned to the symbols/glyphs in  One benefit of this formalism is that the definition of "the integers" (however they may be defined) is not conflated with any particular system for writing/representing them; in this way, these two distinct (albeit closely related) concepts are kept separate. 

Balanced form representations

Balanced form representations are representations where for every positive digit , there exist a corresponding negative digit  such that . It follows that . Only odd bases can have balanced form representations, as otherwise  has to be the opposite of itself and hence 0, but . This convention is adopted in finite fields of odd prime order :

Dual signed-digit representation
The digit set for balanced form representations is self-dual.

For integers
Given the digit set  and function  as defined above, let us define an integer endofunction  as the following:

Each signed-digit representation  has a valuation 
. 
Examples include balanced ternary with digits .  

For decimal fractions

Each signed-digit representation  has a valuation

For real numbers

Each signed-digit representation  has a valuation 
. 
The infinite series always converges to a finite real number.

For other number systems

Integers modulo powers of 
Each signed-digit representation  has a valuation

Prüfer groups
A Prüfer group is the quotient group  of the integers and the -adic rationals. Each signed-digit representation  has a valuation

Circle group
The circle group is the quotient group  of the integers and the real numbers. The set of all signed-digit representations of the circle group is given by the Cantor space , the set of all right-infinite concatenated strings of digits . Each signed-digit representation  has a valuation 

The infinite series always converges.

-adic integers
The set of all signed-digit representations of the -adic integers,  is given by the Cantor space , the set of all left-infinite concatenated strings of digits . Each signed-digit representation  has a valuation

-adic solenoids
The set of all signed-digit representations of the -adic solenoids,  is given by the Cantor space , the set of all doubly infinite concatenated strings of digits . Each signed-digit representation  has a valuation

In written and spoken language

Indo-Aryan languages
The oral and written forms of numbers in the Indo-Aryan languages use a negative numeral (e.g., "un" in Hindi and Bengali, "un" or "unna" in Punjabi, "ekon" in Marathi) for the numbers between 11 and 90 that end with a nine. The numbers followed by their names are shown for Punjabi below (the prefix "ik" means "one"): 
 19 unni, 20 vih, 21 ikki
 29 unatti, 30 tih, 31 ikatti
 39 untali, 40 chali, 41 iktali
 49 unanja, 50 panjah, 51 ikvanja
 59 unahat, 60 sath, 61 ikahat
 69 unattar, 70 sattar, 71 ikhattar
 79 unasi, 80 assi, 81 ikiasi
 89 unanve, 90 nabbe, 91 ikinnaven.

Similarly, the Sesotho language utilizes negative numerals to form 8's and 9's.
 8 robeli (/Ro-bay-dee/)  meaning "break two" i.e. two fingers down
 9 robong (/Ro-bong/) meaning "break one" i.e. one finger down

Classical Latin
In Classical Latin, integers 18 and 19 did not even have a spoken, nor written form including corresponding parts for "eight" or "nine" in practice - despite them being in existence. Instead, in Classic Latin,

18 = duodēvīgintī ("two taken from twenty"), (IIXX or XIIX),
19 = ūndēvīgintī ("one taken from twenty"), (IXX or XIX)
20 = vīgintī ("twenty"), (XX).

For upcoming integer numerals [28, 29, 38, 39, ..., 88, 89] the additive form in the language had been much more common, however, for the listed numbers, the above form was still preferred. Hence, approaching thirty, numerals were expressed as:

28 = duodētrīgintā ("two taken from thirty"), less frequently also yet vīgintī octō / octō et vīgintī ("twenty eight / eight and twenty"), (IIXXX or XXIIX versus XXVIII, latter having been fully outcompeted.)
29 = ūndētrīgintā ("one taken from thirty") despite the less preferred form was also at their disposal.

This is one of the main foundations of contemporary historians' reasoning, explaining why the subtractive I- and II- was so common in this range of cardinals compared to other ranges. Numerals 98 and 99 could also be expressed in both forms, yet "two to hundred" might have sounded a bit odd - clear evidence is the scarce occurrence of these numbers written down in a subtractive fashion in authentic sources.

Finnish Language
There is yet another language having this feature (by now, only in traces), however, still in active use today. This is the Finnish Language, where the (spelled out) numerals are used this way should a digit of 8 or 9 occur. The scheme is like this:

1 = "yksi" (Note: yhd- or yht- mostly when about to be declined; e.g. "yhdessä" = "together, as one [entity]")
2 = "kaksi" (Also note: kahde-, kahte- when declined)
3 = "kolme"
4 = "neljä"
...
7 = "seitsemän"
8 = "kah(d)eksan" (two left [for it to reach it])
9 = "yh(d)eksän" (one left [for it to reach it])
10 = "kymmenen" (ten)

Above list is no special case, it consequently appears in larger cardinals as well, e.g.:
399 = "kolmesataayhdeksänkymmentäyhdeksän"

Emphasizing of these attributes stay present even in the shortest colloquial forms of numerals:

1 = "yy"
2 = "kaa"
3 = "koo"
...
7 = "seiska"
8 = "kasi"
9 = "ysi"
10 = "kymppi"

However, this phenomenon has no influence on written numerals, the Finnish use the standard Western-Arabic decimal notation.

Time keeping
In the English language it is common to refer to times as, for example, 'seven to three', 'to' performing the negation.

Other systems
There exist other signed-digit bases such that the base . The standard binary numeral system would only use digits of value .

Note that non-standard signed-digit representations are not unique.  For instance:

 
 
 
 

The non-adjacent form (NAF) of Booth encoding does guarantee a unique representation for every integer value. However, this only applies for integer values. For example, consider the following repeating binary numbers in NAF,

See also
 Balanced ternary
 Negative base
 Redundant binary representation

Notes and references

 J. P. Balantine (1925) "A Digit for Negative One", American Mathematical Monthly 32:302.
 Lui Han, Dongdong Chen, Seok-Bum Ko, Khan A. Wahid "Non-speculative Decimal Signed Digit Adder" from Department of Electrical and Computer Engineering, University of Saskatchewan.

Non-standard positional numeral systems
Number theory
Ring theory
Arithmetic dynamics
Coding theory
Formal languages